Entoloma abortivum, commonly known as the aborted entoloma or shrimp of the woods, is an edible mushroom in the Entolomataceae family of fungi. Caution should be used in identifying the species before eating (similar species such as Entoloma sinuatum being poisonous). First named Clitopilus abortivus by Miles Joseph Berkeley and Moses Ashley Curtis, it was given its current name by the Dutch mycologist Marinus Anton Donk in 1949.

It was believed that the honey mushroom, Armillaria mellea, was parasitizing the entoloma. But  research has indicated that the inverse may be true—the entoloma may be parasitizing the honey mushroom.
There is still some disagreement by mushroom collectors about this since it is common to see both the aborted and unaborted forms of the entoloma on wood and in leaf litter, whereas Armillaria generally only fruits on wood. Both versions of the entoloma have also been observed when there are no Armillaria fruiting.

See also
List of Entoloma species

References

External links

Entolomataceae
Edible fungi
Fungi described in 1859
Fungi of North America
Taxa named by Miles Joseph Berkeley